Xu Jie may refer to:

 Xu Jie (Southern Tang) (868–943), Southern Tang politician
 Xu Jie (Ming dynasty) (1503–1583), Ming dynasty politician
 Xu Jie (politician, born 1955), PRC politician

Sportspeople
 Xu Jie (basketball), member of the China men's national basketball team
 Xu Jie (table tennis) (born 1982), Chinese-Polish table tennis player
 Xu Jie (sitting volleyball) (born 1983), Chinese sitting volleyball player